Listen Out is an annual Australian music festival that is held in  Brisbane, Melbourne, Perth and Sydney. 
Listen Out was established by 'Fuzzy' who also run events including; Harbourlife, Field Day, Curveball and Touch Bass. They previously ran Parklife Music Festival. Their first festival was held on Saturday September 28, 2013 in Sydney, Australia.

The 2020 and 2021 festivals were cancelled due to the Covid-19 pandemic and is scheduled to return in 2022.

Artist line-ups by years

2013

2014

2015

2016

2017

2018

2019

2022 
 24kGoldn (USA)
 AJ Tracey (UK)
 Barkaa
 bbno$ (CAN)
 Blanke
 Bru-C (UK)
 Central Cee (UK)
 Chris Lake (UK)
 Culture Shock (UK)
 Dameeeela
 Dave Winnel
 Disclosure (UK)
 Doechii (USA)
 Electric Fields
 James Hype (UK)
 JID (USA)
 JessB (NZ) Melbourne and Perth only 
 The Jungle Giants
 Kito
 Louis the Child (USA)
 LP Giobbi (USA)
 Meduza (ITA)
 Memphis LK
 Miiesha
 Nia Archives (UK)
 Pania
 Pirra
 Polo G (USA)
 Pretty Girl
 Qrion (JPN)
 Stace Cadet and KLP
 Roddy Ricch (USA)
 Tove Lo (SWE)
 Trippie Redd (USA)
 Young Thug (USA)

 Young Thug was removed from the lineup due to him being arrested on gang related charges and uncertainty of when his legal issues will discontinue. He was replaced by Roddy Ricch and Trippie Redd
 Polo G withdrew from the lineup due to unspecified reasons. He was replaced by JID
 Doechii had to withdraw from the lineup at the last minute due to contracting COVID-19. As a result, bbno$ played an extended set in both Melbourne and Perth, JessB was added to the lineup for the same weekend, and she was replaced by Dave Winnel and Pania during the Sydney, Brisbane, and Adelaide shows
 AJ Tracey and James Hype did not perform at the Perth show due to illness

References

External links 
https://www.fuzzy.com.au/
https://www.listenout.com.au/
https://www.facebook.com/ListenOut/

Concert tours
Recurring events established in 2013
Electronic music festivals in Australia